Hellinsia mallecoicus is a moth of the family Pterophoridae. It is found in Chile.

The wingspan is 19‑21 mm. The forewings are brown‑grey, speckled with isolated brown scales. The hindwings are grey‑brown and the fringes are grey‑white. Adults are on wing in January, March and October.

References

Moths described in 1991
mallecoicus
Pterophoridae of South America
Fauna of Chile
Moths of South America
Endemic fauna of Chile